XHYQ-FM is a radio station on 98.5 FM in Fresnillo, Zacatecas. It is owned by Grupo Radiofónico ZER and carries its La Tremenda grupera format.

History
XEYQ-AM 1500 received its concession on September 28, 1978. It was owned by Edmundo Llamas Felix and broadcast with 5,000 watts day and 150 watts night. XEYQ was sold in 1997 to Radio Comunicación de Zacatecas, which moved it to 640 kHz and upgraded nighttime power to 1,000 watts. Ralla Zacatecana became the concessionaire in 2000

XEYQ was cleared to move to FM in November 2010.

References

Radio stations in Zacatecas
Radio stations established in 1978